Tirupati Eparchaean Unconformity, a notified National Geo-heritage Monument is a major discontinuity of stratigraphic significance that represents a period of remarkable serenity in the geological history of the earth i.e. sudden changes and discontinuity in the rock layers in earth's crust. It is seen at the steep natural slopes, road scars and ravines in the Tirupati – Tirumala Ghat road in Tirupati district of Andhra Pradesh, India.

In 2001, the Geological Survey of India (GSI) declared the unconformity to be one of the 26 "Geological Monuments of India". GSI's commemoration document, published on the occasion of the 150 years anniversary celebration, provides an insight into the formation of the subcontinent, the orogeny, the paleoenvironment  and the exotic collection of paleo-flora and fauna. The details provided for the Eparchaean Unconformity monument indicate that this feature forms the boundary surface between Proterozoic Nagari Quartzites and Archaean granite. The time gap between the formation of the two units is at least 500 Ma.

At this location, the boundary is between sedimentary rocks of the Cudappah Supergroup,  1600 million years in age, and Archaean rocks comprising granites, gneisses and dolerite dykes that are more than 2100 million years old. This unconformity gives an indication of the enormous time gap in the creation of the earth's crust.

Topography
The basin is delimited between the Palakonda-Velikonda and Sanambatla-Srikalahasti and Nagari ranges of the Eastern Ghats. Tirupati Temple, the most famous pilgrimage centre in South India is in the midst of the range of hills. The hills enclose the temple town to give it a form of an amphitheatre setting.

Geology

The Tirupati hills are situated at the foot of a range of hills known by several names, including 'Seshachala', 'Venkatachala' and 'Balaji'. There are four geological units:
(1) Archaean rocks of the eastern Dharwar Craton (the granites and gneisses)
(2) the Eparchean unconformity (Quartzose sandstones overlying the granite with a distinct unconformity)
(3) Puranas (a general name for Proterozoic sedimentary sequences found in a series of basins deposited on the Indian Shield; including the Cuddapah Basin)
(4) Quaternary deposits
The Tirumala hills essentially of precambrian period are composed of sedimentary rocks – quartzites and intercalated shales, which are referred to as the Nagari quartzites, which forms part of the Cuddapah Supergroup. It is  a subset of the Purana rock succession that rests above the archaean rocks.

The steep scarp of the ranges shows the Eparchian Unconformity's topographic, structural and denudational features.
A prominent Eparchaean Unconformity of the formation resting on the archaean peninsular gneissic complex is noted. Rocks of the Cuddapah Supergroup, and the overlying Kurnool Group, comprise the stratigraphic sequence of the basin. This feature is contiguous all along the defined Archaean-Cuddapah contact zone even though its age may vary along its traced path.

Access
The location of the Geological Monument is well connected by road, rail and air routes.
The nearest railhead to Tirumala hills is Tirupati.
The nearest airport is located at Renigunta, in Tirupati city, which connects to Chennai, Hyderabad and Bangalore airports. Regular bus services (both private and government) are operated by all the states bordering Andhra Pradesh.

Gallery

References

National Geological Monuments in India
Geology of Andhra Pradesh
Tirupati
Tirupati district
Geography of Tirupati district